Ardozyga micropa is a species of moth in the family Gelechiidae. It was described by Edward Meyrick in 1904. It is found in Australia, where it has been recorded from Victoria and South Australia.

The forewings are dark purplish-fuscous, sprinkled with grey-whitish and with five white costal dots from the middle to near the apex. The plical and second discal stigmata are white, partially darker-edged and there are some minute white dots on the termen. The hindwings are grey, darker posteriorly and with the base thinly scaled.

References

Ardozyga
Moths described in 1904
Taxa named by Edward Meyrick
Moths of Australia